The Highfield School is a coeducational secondary school and sixth form located in Letchworth, Hertfordshire. The Highfield School teaches from Year 7 through to Year 12 or 13 The school is part of the Letchworth Sixth Form Consortium with Fearnhill School. It received a with outstanding features OFSTED grade.

Houses
Students are allocated to tutor groups which form houses. There are six houses: Alan Turing, Martin Luther King, Mary Seacole, Rosalind Franklin, Charlotte Bronte and Steven Hawking. Which have the house colours of yellow, red, blue, green, purple and orange respectively; the houses are named after famous people from history. The houses were previously known as Anglia, Mercia, Northumbria and Wessex before they were changed in 2008 and Babbage, Curie, Einstein and Armstrong up until 2022.

Students can earn house points and the house with the most house points at the end of the year win the house cup.

Throughout the year there are inter-house competitions including various small tournaments that are held in timetabled P.E lessons, dance competitions and a sports day (at the end of the school year).

Science 
Highfield School specialises in Science, and there are many Science and Maths events including a Science Festival. Students at Highfield, alongside Fearnhill School and many local primaries, take part in Science-related events, including a celebration evening. The school also works closely to develop science and maths in their partner primary schools throughout the year.

Original buildings 
The original school buildings were designed using a system of standard prefabricated components, and construction work started in May 1964. The prefabrication system used was SEAC Mark 1 (2' 8" Steel).

New building
In January 2017 the school moved into a new purpose-built £15 million building beside the old one, the latter being consequently demolished. The new building was fully financed by the Education Funding Agency. Originally North Hertfordshire District Council turned down the application on the grounds that the development would have a detrimental effect on neighbouring residential areas "due to its size and proximity to nearby buildings." They also raised concerns regarding the quality of the design. However, the planning inspector dismissed these claims stating that the building would not have an adverse effect on the locale.

Foundation and partnership 
The Highfield School is a foundation school and is part of The Letchworth Garden City Education Partnership. The partnership pairs Highfield with Fearnhill School; the sixth form students can pick subjects which are taught at Fearnhill alongside Highfield.

References

Secondary schools in Hertfordshire
Foundation schools in Hertfordshire
Educational institutions established in 1965
Buildings and structures in Letchworth
1965 establishments in England